Girida rigida is a moth in the family Geometridae first described by Charles Swinhoe in 1892. It is found from the Ryukyu Islands through tropical and subtropical south-east Asia to New Caledonia. Records for eastern Africa refer to Girida sporadica, which was promoted to species rank in 2012.

The wings are dark grey with a fine double white postmedial line on each wing.

References

Eupitheciini
Moths of Asia
Moths of Oceania
Insects of Southeast Asia
Moths of Borneo
Moths of Indonesia
Moths of Japan
Endemic fauna of the Ryukyu Islands
Moths described in 1892